Rahim Hatami-ye Do (also Romanized as Raḥīm Hātami-ye Do, meaning "Rahim Hatami 2") is a village in Dowreh Rural District, Chegeni District, Dowreh County, Lorestan Province, Iran. At the 2006 census, its population was 16, in 4 families.

References 

Towns and villages in Dowreh County